Secondary Highway 523, commonly referred to as Highway 523, is a provincially maintained highway in the Canadian province of Ontario. The highway begins at the Nipissing–Hastings boundary, where it continues south to Highway 127. It ends at Highway 60 in the village of Madawaska. The route was assumed as a provincial highway in 1956.

Route description 
Highway 523 begins at the boundary between the Hastings County and Nipissing District, east of Algonquin Provincial Park. From here the road continues south as the Madawaska Road to Maynooth, where it meets the Peterson Road and Hastings Road, all former Colonization Roads which served to open the northern frontier to settlement in the 1850s. North of the boundary, the Highway begins and is known as Cross Lake Road. It passes through a sparsely populated region dotted with lakes and muskeg, generally remaining straight, though curving sporadically to avoid the many obstacles presented by the Canadian Shield.

It turns back to the north and later approaches the northwestern tip of Bark Lake, on the opposite shore as Bell Bay Provincial Park. Here the highway curves to the west and follows the delta of the Madawaska River, curving north just short of entering the village of Madawaska. It ends at an intersection with Highway60.

History 
Highway 523 was first designated along with many of the secondary highways in Ontario in 1956.
The route was paved at the time of assumption,
and has remained the same since.

Major intersections

References 

523